The Coalition for Democratic Change (CDC) is a political alliance in Liberia.

History
The alliance was formed in January 2017 to contest the 2017 general elections, bringing together the Congress for Democratic Change, National Patriotic Party and the Liberia People's Democratic Party. It nominated George Weah, leader of the Congress for Democratic Change, as its presidential candidate. Weah was elected President in the second round of voting with 61.5% of the vote, whilst the CDC won 21 of the 73 seats in the House of Representatives.

References

2017 establishments in Liberia
Political parties established in 2017
Political party alliances in Liberia